Oakbrook Terrace is a city in DuPage County, Illinois, and is a suburb of Chicago. Per the 2020 census, the population was 2,751. It is the smallest town in DuPage County, in terms of area and population.

History
Oakbrook Terrace was originally named Utopia, a name suggested by a postmaster. The name Oakbrook Terrace was adopted in November 1959.

Geography

Demographics
As of the 2020 census there were 2,751 people, 1,346 households, and 668 families residing in the city. The racial makeup of the city was 60.05% White, 9.09% African American, 0.62% Native American, 17.74% Asian, 0.04% Pacific Islander, 4.43% from other races, and 8.03% from two or more races. Hispanic or Latino of any race were 11.20% of the population.

There were 1,346 households, out of which 27.27% had children under the age of 18 living with them, 36.26% were married couples living together, 9.21% had a female householder with no husband present, and 50.37% were non-families. 34.70% of all households were made up of individuals, and 13.30% had someone living alone who was 65 years of age or older. The average household size was 2.80 and the average family size was 2.16.

The city's age distribution consisted of 14.3% under the age of 18, 10.3% from 18 to 24, 35.6% from 25 to 44, 22% from 45 to 64, and 17.9% who were 65 years of age or older. The median age was 35.8 years. For every 100 females, there were 101.6 males. For every 100 females age 18 and over, there were 100.9 males.

The median income for a household in the city was $61,563, and the median income for a family was $89,900. Males had a median income of $54,911 versus $50,500 for females. The per capita income for the city was $37,713. About 7.8% of families and 16.7% of the population were below the poverty line, including 4.2% of those under age 18 and 8.1% of those age 65 or over.

Note: the US Census treats Hispanic/Latino as an ethnic category. This table excludes Latinos from the racial categories and assigns them to a separate category. Hispanics/Latinos can be of any race.

Points of interest
Oakbrook Terrace Tower, an octagonal 31-story office building, was designed by Helmut Jahn and built in 1987. It is the tallest building in Illinois outside the city limits of Chicago and is currently owned by The Blackstone Group. The  tower has  of office space. The tower was long dogged by rumors and news reports that it was leaning or sinking. It stands on the site of the former Dispensa’s Kiddie Kingdom and Castle of Toys.

Drury Lane is a large theater and conference center adjacent to the Oakbrook Terrace Tower. It boasts a 2,000 seat banquet hall and a 971-seat theater. The facility can host: wedding receptions and banquets, corporate meetings and conferences, trade shows and conventions, live theater, and concerts. Located on the site is a Hilton Suites Hotel and Hilton Garden Inn.

The headquarters of Redbox and the Joint Commission, which accredits US healthcare entities, are located in Oakbrook Terrace.

References

 
Chicago metropolitan area
Cities in Illinois
Populated places established in 1959
Cities in DuPage County, Illinois
1959 establishments in Illinois